Phil Madsen is a singer/songwriter based in Auckland, New Zealand.

He grew up in Nelson and has been performing since the age of four. He is the second youngest child in a family of eight children. His father was an entertainer who played the piano and the piano accordion, and his mother taught piano theory. By the age of four Phil was performing with his family throughout the Nelson region.

He first entered the public spotlight as the lead singer of Kiwi pop duo Nurture, formed with songwriter and producer Christopher Banks.  The band scored two radio hits, “Beautiful” in 2001 and “Did You Do It All For Love?” in 2002.

In 2004, he recorded “When I Get Back To You”, the theme song for the Mitsubishi Diamante advertising campaign in New Zealand.  Later that year, he released his debut solo single, “Beach (Follow Me)”.

Phil has performed with the NZSO, the CSO, and the Auckland Philharmonia Orchestra.  He has performed regularly at Coca-Cola Christmas in the Park and has headlined many major events including support for Cher on the New Zealand leg of her Farewell Tour.

In 2009, he gave a powerful performance at the Skycity Starlight Symphony, singing the entirety of 'Bohemian Rhapsody' (Queens) live.

References

External links
Home page

Living people
Year of birth missing (living people)
New Zealand pop singers
People from Nelson, New Zealand